Microcotyle ditrematis is a species of monogenean, parasitic on the gills of a marine fish. It belongs to the family Microcotylidae.

Hosts and localities
The host-type is  Ditrema temminckii temminckii (Embiotocidae) and the type locality is off Japan.

References 

Microcotylidae
Animals described in 1940
Parasites of fish
Fauna of Japan